Malolos, officially the City of Malolos, is a 1st class component city and capital of the province of Bulacan, Philippines. According to the 2020 census, it has a population of 261,189 people.

It is the capital city of the province of Bulacan as the seat of the provincial government.

It is one of the major suburbs conurbated to Metro Manila, situated in the southwestern part of Bulacan, in the Central Luzon Region (Region 3) in the island of Luzon and part of the Metro Luzon Urban Beltway Super Region.

Malolos was the site of the constitutional convention of 1898, known as the Malolos Convention, that led to the establishment of the First Philippine Republic, at the sanctuary of the Barasoain Church. The convent of the Malolos Cathedral served as the presidential palace at that time. Malolos gave birth to the first constitutional republic in Asia.

History
Miguel Lopez de Legazpi conquered the 8 villages along Malolos River and integrated it into one entity dated November 14, 1571, and constituted it as an Encomienda de Malolos the Adelantado entrusted the settlements to conquistador Don Marcos de Herrera. On April 5, 1572, Legazpi merges the encomiendas of Malolos and Calumpit into a single entity to form a new town of Calumpit with Juan Moron and Herrera as co-encomenderos.

On April 15, 1572, Legazpi entrusted 6 villages along Atlag River and given it to Don Jeronimo Tirado.

Nine years later, Malolos was officially established as a town and included it in Bulacan and dismembered on Alcaldia de Calumpit on June 11, 1580, and accepted as priory with Fray Matheo de Mendoza as its first minister in an Augustinian Council held in Tondo Convent but the civil administration still belongs to its encomendero at that time, Don Jeronimo Tirado.

The Tagalog constituted the majority of the Malolos populace although it is said that the town had a Kapampangan origin. They were led by prominent families, among them are descendants of the royal clans of Gatbontons, Gatmaitan, Gatsalian (Gatchalian), Dimagiba, Lakandola, Ladia and Lacancale and in the 17th-19th centuries, Chinese Filipino families through Tondo and Binondo, such as Chichioco, Cojuangco, Chiong, Chico, Cunanan, Tantocos, Tanchangco, Tanjosoy, Tengco, Tenjeco, Tiongson, Lomotan, Manahan, joined by Spanish Filipino families of Adriano, Bautista, Jacinto, Reyes, Santos, Rustia, de Leon, Agustin, Vasquez, Valenzuela, Crisostomo and Estrella.

Chinese Filipino traders settled in Malolos starting in 1670 for economic opportunity. The settlers increased, and Malolos began engaging with textile, rice production. However, the Chinese are expelled from the town on June 30, 1755, due to political and social issues.

On August 31, 1859, Malolos was divided into three independent towns; "Malolos", "Barasoain, and "Santa Isabel". These new towns are former districts of Malolos, with own respective Presidente Municipal and Parish priests. With the beginning of American rule in 1903, these towns were again reunited into a single municipality. The two other districts became barangays under the political jurisdiction of Malolos.

A major factor in the progress of Malolos was the opening of the Manila–Dagupan railways in April 1892.

Malolos was first organized into a formal municipal unit in 1822 when the first "alcalde constitucional" or municipal head was appointed. He was Jorge de Victoria, a Filipino, who like all succeeding "alcaldes", served for one year. He was followed by thirty-one other "alcaldes", with Juan Dimagiba as the thirty-first. In 1859, Malolos was subdivided into three administrative districts; Malolos, Barasoain and Santa Isabel. Juan Dimagiba became the first "alcalde" of the down-scaled Malolos. There were 12 others who served as "alcaldes" from 1859 to 1879, the first one being Mariano C. Cristobal and the second being Capitan Tomas Tanchanco, whose term marked the start of civil turmoil in the town.

Philippine Republic

Malolos is the historical site of the constitutional convention of 1898 that led to the establishment of the First Philippine Republic, the first republic in Asia, led by Emilio Aguinaldo. Malolos served as the capital of the short-lived republic from 1898 to 1899. In 1899, after the Malolos Constitution was ratified, the Universidad Scientifico Literaria de Filipinas was established in Malolos, Bulacan. It offered Law as well as Medicine, Surgery and Notary Public; Academia Militar,(the Philippine's First Military School) which was established on October 25, 1898; and The Burgos Institute, (the Philippine's first law school) and an exclusive school for boys.

The Congress of the Revolutionary Government of the Philippines convened in Barasoain Church in Malolos on September 15, 1898. On the 18th, Aguinaldo proclaimed Malolos as the capital of the Philippines. The first important act of the Congress was the ratification on September 29, 1898, of the independence proclamation at Kawit, Cavite of June 12, 1898. On October 19, 1898, by virtue of an act of Congress, the Universidad Literaria de Filipinas was established. It was in Malolos on December 20, 1898, when Gen. Emilio Aguinaldo declared December 30 of every year as a day of national mourning. The greatest achievement and for which the Malolos Congress was known was the framing of the Malolos Constitution, prepared by a committee headed by Felipe Calderón, was approved by the congress after amendments have been made on January 20, 1899, sanctioned by Aguinaldo the next day and promulgated on January 22. The last congressional act of the Malolos Congress was the inauguration of the Philippine Republic with Aguinaldo as the President on January 23, 1899, amidst the people's jubilation.

On March 31, 1899, at the height of the Philippine–American War, Aguinaldo ordered Gen. Antonio Luna to set the Malolos Cathedral including its huge silver altar on fire as part of their strategy called "Scorched-earth Policy" where everything will be rendered useless. Malolos was totally destroyed when the Americans captured the capital. Aguinaldo escaped to San Fernando, Pampanga before the American Forces arrived at Malolos.

Malolos as the capital of Bulacan

More than a year after the 1899 Battle of Malolos and the victory of and occupation by American forces, the national seat of power was officially conferred again to the City of Manila and on February 27, 1901, by the virtue of Public Law Number 88 of the Philippine Commission, the commission officially transferred the capital seat from the heavily damaged nearby town of Bulakan to the Town of Malolos and it became the capital of Bulacan.

The Casa Presidencia de Malolos was converted as the new Casa Real of Bulacan (became Casa Real Shrine) making it as the new Official Office and Residence of Governor until 1930 when the new Provincial Capitol Building in Barrio Guinhawa, also in Malolos was built.

Governments of Malolos after the Philippine–American War
During American Period  After the War, the Americans appointed a martial law administrator in the person of Jose Reyes Tiongson. He served as "presidente politico militar" from 1901 to 1902.  With the capture of Pres. and Gen. Emilio Aguinaldo in Palanan, Isabela and the defeat of most of the Filipino armed forces all over the country, the Americans began to put up a network of local government units. The municipality of Malolos was re-organized, composed of the districts of Malolos, Barasoain and Santa Isabel. Appointed "presidente municipal" or town mayor was Ramon Gonzalez de Leon of Sitio Tampoy, (grandfather of TV host Joey de Leon) one of the original members of the Katipunan Balangay Apuy. He was in the post for two years, 1903 to 1905.  He and the nine others who followed him were all appointive officials. When the Philippines became a commonwealth, Leon Valencia was elected mayor in 1937, the first ever elected. Diosdado Dimagiba succeeded him in 1940 but had to vacate the position because of the Japanese conquest. Also in this period, the Malolos Municipal Hall facing the Malolos Church was built, in a manner of Neo-Classical Roman Style.
During Japanese Occupation  The Japanese appointed two "punong bayan" or mayors, Luis Peralta and Ignacio Tapang. After the joint US and Philippine Commonwealth armed forces liberated Malolos in March 1945, Adonis P. Maclang of the guerrillas' Bulacan Military Area was appointed guerrilla mayor of the town, before battle for the liberation of Bulacan, the local Filipino forces of the 3rd and 32nd Infantry Division of the Philippine Commonwealth Army and 3rd Constabulary Regiment of the Philippine Constabulary was liberated in Malolos to helping the local guerrilla resistance fighters of the Bulacan Guerrilla Unit and American troops of the U.S. Army against the Japanese in 1945 at the end of World War II, followed by the appointment of Isberto Crisostomo as civilian town mayor in 1946. The first post-war election was held in 1946 and Carlos Maclang was elected mayor.

Contemporary history
In 1998, Malolos was the site again for another Presidential inauguration of Joseph Estrada on June 30, 1998, in Barasoain Church as the President of the Republic of the Philippines. Estrada, whose real surname is Ejercito, traced his ancestry to the Ejercitos who were prominent in the history of Malolos.

It was in summer of 2004, the construction of the Malolos flyover marks a new milestone in their flourishing history being the first in the city. The structure, part of the former Philippine President Gloria Macapagal Arroyo's Bridge Program, the construction was undertaken in a record-breaking 60 days only according to the Department of Public Works and Highways. The structure was built to solve the daily traffic jam at the place, which have become a bane to motorist and also to employees in both private and government offices in this city. This remarkable feat hastened not only the city's development in commerce and trade but its neighboring municipalities as well.

On July 28–30, 2008, the city was chosen to host the first National Conference for Philippine-Spanish Relations. The conference's theme was "Philippine-Spanish Relations: Sharing Common History and Culture."  This is a project both of the Province of Bulacan's research arm, Center for Bulacan Studies of Bulacan State University and by the Samahang Pangkasaysayan ng Bulacan, Incorporated.

Cityhood 

The charter of the City of Malolos was first passed through Republic Act 8754 on November 4, 1999. The bill's author was then Rep. Wilhelmino M. Sy-Alvarado. A plebiscite was conducted on December 18, 1999, where the votes "not" in favor of cityhood won. During the plebiscite, the clash between the pro and anti-cityhood groups reached the peak when the allegedly fraud done by the antis to manipulate the results in able to win the "No" votes gathering 11,535 count against 9,321 "Yes" votes.

Due to the electoral fraud on Malolos cityhood plebiscite, then Congressman Wilhelmino Alvarado and then Mayor Restituto Roque filed an electoral protest at the Commission on Elections dated December 29, 1999, to recount the results of the plebiscite.

The recount reversed the initial decision and the Commission found out that 10,746 votes approved the cityhood and only 8,402 against the conversion.

The protest was granted by the Second Division of Commission on Elections, per Resolution No. Election Protest Case 99–2, October 8, 2001, the COMELEC affirmed that the "YES" vote won so the Cityhood of Malolos is valid as of December 18, 1999.
In 2010, the Malolos City Council passes the City Resolution 24-2010 declaring December 18 of every year to be celebrated as Cityhood Day.

The invalidation of R.A 9591 the Lone District of Malolos Act

On December 19, 2007, then Senator Mar Roxas introduced and filed Senate Bill 1986 that seeks to amend section 57 of Republic Act 8754, the component law converting Malolos from a municipality to a component city. The bill was read on First Reading and Referred to the Committee on Rules on the same day as it was filed. On May 13, 2008, it was referred to the Committee on Local Government, on motion of Senator Francis Pangilinan. On October 6, 2008, the bill was sponsored by Senator Benigno S. Aquino III, and co-sponsored by Senators Richard J. Gordon and Mar Roxas.

In the House of the Representatives, House Bill 3693 was filed on March 4, 2008, by then Representative Ma. Victoria Sy-Alvarado. The Committee on Local Government, of the House of the Representatives, approved House Bill 3162, declaring Malolos as a lone congressional district separate and distinct from the first congressional district of the province of Bulacan. The said House Bill was substituted by House Bill 3693, which had been approved by the House on April 29, 2008; transmitted on May 5; and was received by the Senate on May 6, 2008.

The Republic Act 9591, entitled "An Act Amending Section 57 of Republic Act No. 8754, otherwise known as the Charter of the City of Malolos" was passed by the House of Representatives and the Senate on April 29, 2008, and February 16, 2009, respectively. It was transmitted to the Office of the President on March 31, 2009. The Act lapsed into law on May 1, 2009, without the signature of the President, in accordance with Article VI, Section 27 (1) of the Constitution.

The Commission on Elections (COMELEC) created a resolution, Resolution Number 09-0544, in the matter of Republic Act No. 9591 on the allocation of one legislative district for the City of Malolos.

On January 28, 2010, the Supreme Court declared the creation of the new legislative district as unconstitutional. The Supreme Court further reaffirmed on March 10, 2010, its decision to declare the creation of the new legislative district as unconstitutional, thus, the city remains part of the 1st District of Bulacan.

Geography
Malolos is bounded by municipalities of Calumpit on northwest, Plaridel on north, Guiguinto on east, Paombong on west,  Bulakan on the southeast and Manila Bay on the south.

Topography
Malolos is relatively flat of about 0.81% to a gently sloping of 2.17%. The slope of the land descends towards west, southwest to southern direction. The highest land elevation is at about 6.0 meters above sea level while the lowest is only half a meter below sea level. A network of natural waterways and rivers of various sizes and importance is traversing through the landscape of the town down south to Manila Bay.

There are three soil types from the major type of Malolos, the soils of the alluvial landscape and these are the Quingua Series, San Manuel Series and the Tagulod Series. Other soil types comprising the soil map of Malolos are the Matimbo Series and Masantol Series, which belong to the soils of the coastal landscape, Loamy Tidal Swamp and Mucky Tidal Swamp from the miscellaneous soil types.

Climate
Malolos belongs to Type 1 category of the Philippine Climate Corona Classification, which has two pronounced seasons, i.e., wet and dry seasons. Wet during the months of June to November and dry from December to May.

The northwest monsoon prevails over the area from October to January bringing in moderate and light rains, the last trade winds predominate from February to April but the high Sierra Madre Mountains interfere with the free circulation of making the area dry with almost no rains during the period, while from May to September the southwest monsoon prevail with strong winds and abundant rainfall, and generally associated with strong typhoon.

Barangays
Malolos is politically subdivided into 51 barangays that are spread over a land area of  consisting of agricultural, commercial, industrial, residential, bodies of water, fishponds, marshes and roads. Many of the name of the barangays were derived from the name of common Philippine trees, because Malolos was once a vast virgin land and forests, before the Spaniards came and Christianized the natives. While others were named in honor of their patron saints.

Demographics

There are 52,547 households in the city. Majority of the Malolos households usually lives along the major roads. It has an average crime rate of 6.28% and has a crime solution efficiency of 97.11%.

Language and ethnicity
The majority of the Maloleños (or Malolenyo in Filipino) traces their roots to Tagalog ethnicity although there are also Kapampangan and other ethnicities who migrated to the city. The vernacular language is Filipino, in the form of Tagalog, while Philippine English is the language most widely used in education and business throughout the city. Although Malolos is the city where the Filipinos established the Spanish as their only official language in the first constitution, the native speakers of Spanish still alive are reduced to the very old members of a handful of families.

Religion

The Christianization of Malolos was done by the Augustinian Order in May 1572 thru the effort of Fray Diego Vivar-Ordonez (parochial vicar of Calumpit, assistant to Fray Diego Herrera and Martin de Rada) and it became one of the visitas of Parish of Nicolas de Tolentino (became San Juan Bautista in 1576). Since 1572 the apostolic administration in Malolos was under the Convent of Calumpit. On June 11, 1580, the mission chapel was accepted by the Augustinians as House of Order and became Iglesia Convento y Malolos with visitas of Paombong, Matimbo, Mambog and Quingua in 1581. Later due to the frequent high tides that submerged the area, the friars moved the church to its present location in Poblacion in 1590 under the curate Fray Cristobal Tarique, where they started to build a church made of light materials and wood. In 1599 Fray Roque de Barrionuevo started to build a church made of stone and it was finished in 1673. The majority of the residents are Christians. Roman Catholic is the predominant religion in the city.

Until today, the Roman Catholic faith in Malolos remained intensive. It is evident through the existence of the three stone churches. (Malolos Cathedral, Barasoain Church, and the Santa Isabel Church)
Being predominantly Catholic, Malolos, together with the whole province of Bulacan is constituted as Vicaria dela Immaculada Concepcion in which the (Cura de Malolos is the Vicar Forane). It was part of the Archdiocese of Manila until March 11, 1962, when Pope John XXIII created the Diocese of Malolos making the Malolos Church its cathedral. In March 2012 the Diocese of Malolos will celebrate its 50th Anniversary.
It was highlighted by the Canonical Coronation of the patroness and queen of the city and the whole province, Virgen Inmaculada Concepción de Malolos enshrined at the cathedral's altar.

Other Christian religious groups, such as Methodists, Aglipayans, Adventists, Baptists, Mormons, and other Protestant churches, as well as Nontrinitarian churches (like Members Church of God International, Iglesia ni Cristo, and Jehovah's Witness) can be found in the city.

Islam (Muslims) could also be found in the city.

Economy

Commerce 

The City of Malolos is quickly becoming commercialized due to its proximity to Metro Manila and for lying between Manila and Clark, Pampanga. Many corporations have put up commercial sites and banking establishments in various places around the city. Many of the businesses and industries in the city include Banking; Business Process Outsourcing; Courier Service; Education; Food Service; Hospitals; Hotels, Resorts & Restaurants; Information and Communications Technology; Insurance; Manpower; ; Realty/Real Property Development; Trade; Transport Services; Travel & Tours; and other services. Robinsons Place Malolos is a major shopping mall owned and operated by Robinsons Malls, the Philippines' second largest mall operator. The mall is located at MacArthur Highway, Barangay Sumapang Matanda. Other shopping malls in Malolos include the Maunlad Malls 1 and 2, both owned and operated by the Union Bank of the Philippines, Graceland Mall, owned and operated by RMR Group of Companies, Vista Mall, Waltermart and Bulacan Eco-Commercial Complex, owned by the Provincial Government of Bulacan.

Chimera Land is an amusement park under construction located in Barangay Sumapang Matanda. Once complete, it will be the first sustainable themed park in the Philippines.

Malolos also serves as the Banking Capital of Bulacan, having the highest number of banking institutions in the province (the city hosts around 46), majority of these are located prominent areas of the city, particularly along Paseo del Congreso Avenue.

Industry 
Due to its close proximity in Manila and its port, Malolos becomes industrialized. Industrial estates, such as First Bulacan Industrial City, where are more than 20 corporations and companies operating their factories inside the estate are a boom. Mighty Corporation, a major player in the Philippine tobacco industry, operates a tobacco factory in the city.

Other industries such as agribusiness, aquaculture, bag making, ceramics, construction, cement making, flowers/ornamentals, furniture, food processing, garments, gifts, houseware making, decor making, jewelry, leather tanning, marble polishing, metallurgy, printing, shoe manufacturing, and textile manufacturing are also present in the city.

Some of the food products produced in Malolos include Ensaymada Malolos, Inipit, Otap Bread, Atsara, and Bagoong.

Infrastructure

Transportation
Public transportation in Malolos is served by buses, jeepneys, and UV Express AUVs. The city is also served by Tricycles, which offer their services on a for-hire basis.

Malolos is known for its Karatig Jeepneys which serves as an intra-city public transportation. The name itself came from the word karatig, which means nearby places or barangays. The Karatig jeepney is the smaller version of the jeepneys which usually have the size of about 3-meters long and can board 8-10 commuters at the back plus 2 passengers in the front seat. Longer models can accommodate about 10–12. Its capacity varies according to the jeep's length and size. There are two Karatig routes around Malolos.

There was a railway service in the city served by the Philippine National Railways. However, in 1988 the North Main Line of the PNR was closed and train services in Malolos ceased immediately. On November 20, 2003, in an attempt to revive the railway service, North Luzon Railways Corporation and China National Machinery and Equipment Group (CNMEG) executed a Contract Agreement for the construction of Section I, Phase I of the North Luzon Railway System from Caloocan to Malolos on a turnkey basis. The project was worth $421,050,000. However, on February 13, 2006, a controversy arose from the project and the project was placed on halt indefinitely. In 2017, the project was revived and was called "North South Commuter Railway" with funds sourced from Japan through a loan. On January 5, 2018, the Department of Transportation broke ground for the first phase of the project.

Utilities
Water services are provided by the City of Malolos Water District (CMWD). The CMWD also provide water services on some barangays in the neighboring towns of Paombong and Hagonoy. Since 2012, the city is suffering from recurring water shortages. Electric services are provided by Meralco, the sole electric power distributor in Malolos.

Government

City Mayor: Christian D. Natividad (PDP–Laban)
City Vice Mayor: Miguel Alberto T. Bautista (Aksyon)
City Councilors:
Francisco J. Castro (NUP)
John Vincent G. Vitug III (NUP)
Niño Carlo C. Bautista (NUP)
Michael M. Aquino (Aksyon)
Miguel Carlos B. Soto (NUP)
Edgardo F. Domingo  (NUP)
Therese Cheryll B. Ople (Aksyon)
Victorino M. Aldaba III (PDP-Laban)
Emmanuel R. Sacay (Aksyon)
Dennis D. San Diego (Aksyon)
Ex Officio Members:
Dionisio Mendoza (Liga ng mga Barangay President)
Patrick S. Dela Cruz (Sangguniang Kabataan Federation President)

Culture

Heritage and tourism

Malolos is hailed as the Premiere Heritage City of Bulacan. Many ancestral houses from the Spanish and American periods, Spanish colonial churches and chapels, historical sites and landmarks, and even structures such as walls and bridges with heritage and historical value are found around the city. Some of these were already marked by National Historical Institute while others are marked by the City Government. The historic town center of Malolos was declared National Heritage Landmark on August 15, 2001, under the name of Malolos Heritage Town.

The Barasoain Church, erected in 1885, was the site of the very First Philippine Congress on September 15, 1898, and the inauguration of the First Philippine Republic on January 23, 1899. In this church the Oath of Office of Emilio Aguinaldo and Joseph Estrada as Philippine presidents took place. Within the premises of Barasoain Church, there are other historical markers installed by National Historical Commission, such as the Universidad Literaria y Scienifico de Filipina at Malolos Convent, General Emilio Aguinaldo Monument at Barasoain patio, and First Philippine Republic marker installed at the left side of the main lateral wall of the church.

The Malolos Cathedral, originally a visita of Tondo in 1572 and became town parish on June 11, 1580, serves the seat of the Roman Catholic Diocese of Malolos from 1962. It served as Presidential Palace during First Republic. It was marked by National Historical Institute in 1956.

Casa Real de Malolos, originally built in 1580, served as Casa Tribunal and Casa Presidencia of the town gobernadorcillo. It became the Spanish treasury in 1673. Declared National Shrine on October 4, 1965. Now it is the Museum of Philippine Political History

Gobierno Militar dela Plaza, ancestral house of Doña Gregoria Vasquez Adriano, became headquarters of Gobierno Militar de la Plaza during 1898–1899, marked and declared heritage site in 1998

Other historical heritage landmarks marked by the National Historical Institute are:
Jose Cojuanco Shrine, the ancestral house of Cojuangcos, was marked and declared heritage site in 2009
Paaralan ng mg Kababaihan ng malolos, ruins of the actual site of the school of the women of Malolos established in 1889.
Pook na Sinilangan ni Isidoro Matanglawin-Torres, actual site of the birthplace of General Isidoro Torres at Barrio Matimbo, a Katipunan General, marked by National Historical Institute.
(Pook na Sinilangan ni Guillermo Tolentino, ancestral house of National Artist Guillermo Tolentino, marked by National Historical Commission of the Philippines in 2012.
 Alberta Uitangcoy-Santos House, house of Doña Alberta Uitangcoy-Santos, leader of the famed 20 Women of Malolos. Declared a National Heritage House in 2012 and currently houses the Museum of the Women of Malolos, curated by Carlo Herrera.

Other sites that possess heritage and historical value but are not currently marked by the National Historical Institute:
 Casa Tribunal de Malolos, 2nd town hall of Malolos at Calle Pariancillo.
 Bulacan Capitol Building, built in 1930 in Art Deco style, designed by Juan Arellano.
 Malolos Municipal Building, built in 1940 in Neo-Classical style at the bank of Liyang River opposite to the cathedral.
 Santa Isabel de Hungria Church and Convent, another Malolos Colonial Church built in 1859.
 Don Ramon Gonzales de Leon House, Gobernadorcillo, built in 1923.
 Don Antonio Bautista House, Aguinaldo Ayunda de Campo, built in 1820 and renovated by Isabelo Tampinco it is the original house of Doña Rufina Tanjosoy.
 Don Jose Bautista, built in 1877 in Art Nouveau manner, ancestral house of Don Jose Bautista, husband of Doña Rufina Tanjosoy.
 Dr. Luis Santos House, art deco house built in 1933 house of Malolos renowned eye doctor. Dr. Luis is a son of Doña Alberta Uitangcoy.
 Hermogenes Reyes House, built in 1904.
 Don Santiago Cruz House at Pariancillo, Barrio Santiago, ancestral house of then Gobernadorcillo Santiago.
 Mariano Crisostomo House I, house of Liberal Gobernadorcillo Don Mariano Crisostomo Calle M. Tengco
 Mariano Crisostomo House II, another house of Mariano Crisostomo located at Calle Estrella, barrio Santo Rosario
 Aguas Potables de Malolos, American Period water cistern built in 1923 by Mayor Mariano Santos-Tengco.
 Tomas Tanchangco House II, another ancestral house of Gobernadorcillo Don Tomas Tanchangco at Calle Tenjeco, Sa Vicente.
 Santo Rosario Chapel, barrio chapel built in 1870 used as temporary town Church when the revolutionaries burned the main town church in 1899.
 Iglesia Filipina Independiente, built in 1903 Bulacan Cathedral of Iglesia Filipina Independietne, also known as Aglipay.
 Atlag Methodist Church, one of the first Methodist Churches in the Philippines also built in 1903.
 Bulacan High School, 1905 ruins of the first secondary high school built by Thomasites in Malolos.
 1913 Gabaldon Building of Malolos Central School
 1919 Logia Malolos No. 46 was constituted and later in 1921, Templo Plaridel which housed Logia Malolos No. 46 was erected in Sto. Rosario.  Its first venerable master was Nicolas Buendia, who later became its mayor, then Governor of Bulacan, then Senator of the Commonwealth under Pres. Manuel L. Quezon.

Feasts and festivals
Dubbed as the Bulacan's City of Festivals, Malolos boasts with many feasts and festivals every year. Some festivals are civic festivities and most are religious festivals.
 Singkaban Festival (Sining at Kalinangan ng Bulacan), a festival of arts and culture in honor of Capitol's patron saint, "Our Lady of Victory", showcasing the traditional arts of "Balagtasan", "Kundiman" and folk dances amidst of the "Singkaban" arches. The festival is celebrated in every second week of September which is in conjunction with the "Linggo ng Bulacan" (Held during September 8–15), A province-wide, week-long celebration consisting of various colourful cultural presentations, art and culinary exhibits, arts and skills contests, and the prestigious annual Dangal ng Lipi Awards Night and concluding with the anniversary of the opening of the Malolos Congress. Yearly, its activities vary depending upon the chosen theme for the year. This festival is named after the special "BAMBOO ART" abundantly known to the Bulacan province especially in Malolos and Hagonoy where Singkaban Art originated. 

 Santo Niño de Malolos Festival – This is held during the last Sunday of January, The biggest and largest expression of devotion to the Holy Child Jesus in the Luzon island, celebrated every last Sunday of January. The festivities begin with an exhibit of "Santo Niño" (Holy Child) and culminate in a grand procession of hundreds of folk, antique and new statues of the Holy Child in different depictions. The highlight of this festival is the hundred-year-old antique miraculous image of Senor Sto Nino de Malolos.
 Pista ng Santisima Trinidad na Matanda - held annually on Trinity Sunday, it is commonly called Pista ng Santisima Trinidad and other called it "Pista ng Barihan" because Barangays of Barihan, Santisima Trinidad and Pinagbakahan were having one fiesta and one common church in a reason still unknown to the elderly since Spanish period. This fiesta started since the 18th century, where thousands of people from different towns and provinces attending this fiesta and flocks into the Old Chapel to pray for petition and wishes. It is not only at Fiesta but every Fridays and Sundays of the year. It is also dub by the Diocese of Malolos as "Quiapo ng Bulacan". The Fiesta highlights is the public exposition of the miraculous and highly venerated antique icons of the Holy Trinity, during procession attended by other holy images from all parts of the province.

The four holy processional icons are:
 Santisima Trinidad de Mayor - oil on canvas, the back of the canvass exposed a date of January 10, 1500, and is thus the oldest Catholic icon in the Philippines. It is considered very miraculous by majority faithful.
 Santisima Trinidad na Bata - oil on rosewood, a 1762 icon is the second-oldest among the processional icons.
 Santisima Trinidad de Trisagio - the last and youngest of the three holy icons depicting the "biblical trinity" 
 The fourth venerated icon, the Santisima Trinidad de Original, it was the nucleus of the chapel, the site was farmland. This icon was enshrined in the Santisima Trinidad Chapel's main retablo. Sadly it was stolen on October 27, 1981, after Pistang Maliit and remains lost.

All of these antique and miraculous images are in the custody of the Bisitang Matanda ng Santisima Trinidad and can be visited and seen at the houses of the designated annual Hermano.
 Pabukang Puso — held every March 19 in Panasahan, commemorates the death of St. Joseph the Worker, Foster-father of Jesus. It is annually held at the front house of Roxas clan in Panasahan, whose patriarch, Valentin Roxas, started it in 1975. This tradition still continues until present day where the younger generations of the clan organising it.
 Pag-akyat Festival — one of the traditionally-preserved feasts in the city, held in Barangay Atlag. It culminates the Ascension of Our Lord.
 Fiesta Republica (A Festival of the Philippine History) - held during every third week of January and celebration of the First Philippine Republic, held since 2011

Parks and museums

 Hardin ng mga Bayani at Sining also known as Capitol Mini-Forest and Children's Park, in Provincial Capitol Compound
 Bulacan Heroes Park in Bulacan State University
 Mini Rizal Park in Bulacan State University
 Museo ng Bulacan, Hiyas ng Bulacan Museum Complex, located 500 m from Barasoain Church, is a cultural center and museum that houses the works, artifacts, relics and manuscripts of Francisco Balagtas, Marcelo H. del Pilar, Gregorio del Pilar, Mariano Ponce and other famous men of Bulacan.
 Casa Real Shrine, now Museum of Philippine Political History
 Barasoain Museum, located across the hall of the Barasoain Convent, is managed by the National Historical Institute.  Its corridors are hung with historical photographs of Bulacan and different rooms relate how democracy was established in the country.  Open daily, 8 am – 5 pm.  Admission is free.  The church and convent were declared as a National Landmark on August 1, 1973, under Presidential Decree No. 260 and both underwent a thorough restoration under the supervision of the National Historical Commission.
 Museo Diocesano de Malolos, an ecclesiastical art museum housed also at the Barasoain Convent, is managed by the Diocese of Malolos.  It houses relics and religious items such as original 19th century baptismal records of Marcelo Hilario (a.k.a. Marcelo H. del Pilar), Francisco Baltazar (a.k.a. Francisco Balagtas) and Gregorio del Pilar; a bone fragment of San Vicente Ferrer encased in glass; priestly robes embroidered with gold-plated silver threads, antique prayer cards and altar frontals from different churches.
 Museum of the Women of Malolos, found in the Uitangcoy-Santos House, this museum has four exhibit halls and a lecture hall of collections relative to the women's historical narrative. It is curated by the fifth-generation grandson of Alberta Uitangcoy-Santos, Carlo Herrera.

Shopping
Robinsons Place Malolos is the 35th mall in Robinsons Malls' nationwide chain and its second in Bulacan. This four-storey shopping center with a multi-level parking area, has a department store, a supermarket and a cinema of its own. This mall also offers a wide selection of restaurants and fast-food outlets, fashion boutiques, tech and service stores as well as health and beauty clinics.

Sports

Malolos has sports venues, such as the Bulacan Sports Complex and Malolos Sports and Convention Center. The Bulacan Sports Complex houses a track field, a football field, basketball courts, an oval, and a lap pool. Both the Bulacan Sports Complex and Malolos Sports & Convention Center had hosted several regional, provincial, and city sports events, such as the 2017 Central Luzon Regional Athletic Association, and the Republica Cup, an invitational sports tournament held annually.

Education

Malolos is hailed as one of the centers of education in Central Luzon region. It has several universities such as the government-funded Bulacan State University, and privately owned Centro Escolar University at Malolos and La Consolacion University Philippines. There are private tertiary schools. It also houses the most populous high school in Central Luzon, Marcelo H. del Pilar National High School, founded in 1905.

The city has 9 public high schools and 45 public elementary schools under the authority of Department of Education Division of City Schools of Malolos. The city schools are divided into two educational districts for representational purposes. There are also privately owned and church-operated schools established in the city. These private schools are members of Malolos City Private schools Association (MACIPRISA). Technical schools and computer colleges can also be found in the city.

Social services

Housing
The Malolos hosts more than 51 residential subdivisions and the Northville 8 Resettlement Project of the Philippine government.

Health
The City Health Office of Malolos is responsible for the planning and implementation of the health care programs provided by the city government. It currently operates seven health centers. The Bulacan Medical Center (formerly Bulacan Provincial Hospital), operated by the provincial government of Bulacan, is also located in the city.

Private hospitals can also be found in the city. Some of the private hospitals that operate in the city are Sacred Heart Hospital, Santos General Hospital, Malolos Maternity Hospital, Malolos San Ildefonso County Hospital, Ofelia Mendoza Maternity and General Hospital, and the Graman Medical and Maternity Hospital.

Sister cities
 Bayambang, Pangasinan
 Hagåtña, Guam

References

External links

 Malolos City Bulacan
 Sangguniang Panlungsod of Malolos
 Malolos City Charter
 Senate Bill 1986 – Amending Malolos City Charter, "THE LONE CONGRESSIONAL DISTRICT OF THE CITY OF MALOLOS"
 Official Website of the Province of Bulacan
 Malolos City on the Official Website of Bulacan
 The Malolos Republic
 The First Philippine Republic at Malolos
 The Malolos Constitution (Translated in English)
 [ Philippine Standard Geographic Code]
 Philippine Census Information
 The American Occupation of Malolos (1899)

 
Cities in Bulacan
Former national capitals
Populated places on Manila Bay
Populated places established in 1580
1580 establishments in the Philippines
Provincial capitals of the Philippines
Component cities in the Philippines